Harper House is a historic home located at Stuarts Draft, Augusta County, Virginia. The house was built about 1888, and is a two-story, brick dwelling with a metal-sheathed hip roof with a bracketed cornice and a one-story front porch on highly decorative wood supports in the Italianate style. It has a two-story rear ell. Also on the property are a contributing meathouse, workshop, garage, windmill support, and granary.

It was listed on the National Register of Historic Places in 2006.

References

Houses on the National Register of Historic Places in Virginia
Italianate architecture in Virginia
Houses completed in 1888
Houses in Augusta County, Virginia
National Register of Historic Places in Augusta County, Virginia